Dolichopus ungulatus is a European species of fly in the family Dolichopodidae.

Gallery

References

ungulatus
Diptera of Europe
Flies described in 1758
Articles containing video clips
Taxa named by Carl Linnaeus